Drosos Kalotheou (born 21 February 1945) is a Cypriot footballer. He played in five matches for the Cyprus national football team from 1965 to 1968.

References

External links
 

1945 births
Living people
Cypriot footballers
Cyprus international footballers
Place of birth missing (living people)
Association footballers not categorized by position